The Well-paid (in Spanish La bien pagada) is a Mexican drama film directed by Alberto Gout. It was filmed in 1948 and starring María Antonieta Pons and Víctor Junco.

Plot
The billionaire Fernando Jordan (Victor Junco) marries Carola Rute (María Antonieta Pons). Carola becomes lover of Carlos. Fernando surprises together after reading a comment understood in a local newspaper that previously tried to extort him. After meditating the tremendous disappointment, he accepts that he made the mistake not to make her love during their brief marriage. He forced her to sign a letter waiving her rights as wife and jet off abroad for many years. When he returns, he learns that Carola is now a singer and cabaret artist named Piedad of The Diamonds. She was abandoned by her lover.

Cast
 María Antonieta Pons ... Carola Rute / Piedada of The Diamonds
 Victor Junco ... Fernando Jordán
 Blanca Estela Pavón ... Violeta Rute
 Carmen Molina ... Julieta Rute
 Jorge Ancira ... Carlos
 Esperanza Issa ... María Rosa
 Carlos Martínez Baena ... Jorge Rute

Reviews
The film was based on the novel by José María Carretero Novillo "El Caballero Audaz" ("The Bold Caballero"), and was adapted and directed by one of the geniuses of the musical melodrama of Mexican Cinema: Alberto Gout. María Antonieta Pons showed a conversion to glamor with designs created by Armando Valdez Arm Peza, leaving tropical environments becoming a citadina woman with worldly tastes and elegant clothes.

References

External links
 
 El Veraz: María Antonieta Pons: The Queen of the Tropics

1948 films
Mexican black-and-white films
Rumberas films
1940s Spanish-language films
Mexican drama films
1948 drama films
Films directed by Alberto Gout
1940s Mexican films